Dieter Dekelver (born 17 August 1979) is a Belgian former professional footballer who played as a forward.

External links
 Dieter Dekelver player profile at Sporza.be 
 Cerclemuseum.be 
 

1979 births
Living people
People from Beringen, Belgium
Belgian footballers
Footballers from Limburg (Belgium)
Association football forwards
Belgian Pro League players
Challenger Pro League players
K.F.C. Lommel S.K. players
R.W.D.M. Brussels F.C. players
Cercle Brugge K.S.V. players
K.V.C. Westerlo players
Lommel S.K. players